South Africa competed at the 2014 Summer Youth Olympics, in Nanjing, China from 16 August to 28 August 2014.

Athletics

South Africa qualified seven athletes.

Qualification Legend: Q=Final A (medal); qB=Final B (non-medal); qC=Final C (non-medal); qD=Final D (non-medal); qE=Final E (non-medal)

Boys
Track & road events

Field Events

Girls
Track & road events

Field events

Canoeing

South Africa qualified one boat based on its performance at the 2013 World Junior Canoe Sprint and Slalom Championships.

Girls

Cycling

South Africa qualified a boys' and girls' team based on its ranking issued by the UCI.

Team

Mixed Relay

Equestrian

South Africa qualified a rider.

Field Hockey

South Africa qualified a boys' and girls' team based on its performance at the African Qualification Tournament.

Boys' Tournament

Roster

 Jacques Bleeker
 Ryan Crowe
 Tyson Dlungwana
 Tevin Kok
 Matthew Martins
 Nqobile Ntuli
 Luke Schooling
 Garth Turner
 Cody van Wyk

Group Stage

Quarterfinal

Semifinal

Bronze Medal Match

Girls' Tournament

Roster

 Natalie Esteves
 Demi Harmse
 Chrissie Haupt
 Marizen Marais
 Kaydee Miller
 Kristen Paton
 Cheneal Raubenheimer
 Simone Strydom
 Buhle Zondi

Group Stage

Quarterfinal

Classification Match 5th-8th Place

7th Place Match

Golf

South Africa qualified one team of two athletes based on the 8 June 2014 IGF Combined World Amateur Golf Rankings.

Individual

Team

Gymnastics

Artistic Gymnastics

South Africa qualified two athletes based on its performance at the 2014 African Artistic Gymnastics Championships.

Boys

Girls

Rhythmic Gymnastics

South Africa qualified one athlete based on its performance at the 2014 African Rhythmic Championships.

Individual

Judo

South Africa qualified one athlete based on its performance at the 2013 Cadet World Judo Championships.

Individual

Team

Sailing

South Africa qualified two boats based on its performance at the Byte CII African Continental Qualifiers.

Shooting

South Africa qualified one shooter based on its performance at the 2014 African Shooting Championships.

Individual

Team

Swimming

South Africa qualified eight swimmers.

Boys

Girls

Mixed

Tennis

South Africa qualified one athlete based on the 9 June 2014 ITF World Junior Rankings.

Singles

Doubles

Triathlon

South Africa qualified two athletes based on its performance at the 2014 African Youth Olympic Games Qualifier.

Individual

Relay

Wrestling

South Africa qualified three athletes based on its performance at the 2014 African Cadet Championships.

Boys

Girls

References

2014 in South African sport
Nations at the 2014 Summer Youth Olympics
South Africa at the Youth Olympics